Sarah Jones (born August 26, 1973) is an American rower. She competed at the 2004 Summer Olympics in Athens, in the women's coxless pair. Jones was born in Olympia, Washington, and resided in Stanwood.

References

1973 births
Living people
American female rowers
Olympic rowers of the United States
Rowers at the 2000 Summer Olympics
Rowers at the 2004 Summer Olympics
World Rowing Championships medalists for the United States
People from Olympia, Washington
21st-century American women